A Little Gold Book of Ghastly Stuff is a "collection of B-sides and rarities" by Neil Gaiman.

The stories, articles, and poems were selected from previously published works, and are:
 "Before You Read This" (first published as Todd Klein print)
 "Featherquest" (first published in Imagine #14)
 "Jerusalem" (first broadcast by BBC Radio 4)
 "Feminine Endings" (first published in Four Letter Word)
 "Orange" (first published in The Starry Rift)
 "Orphee" (first published in Orphee (CD))
 "Ghosts in the Machines" (first published in The New York Times)
 "The Annotated Brothers Grimm: Grimmer Than You Thought" (first published in The New York Times)
 "Black House" (first published in The Washington Post)
 "Summerland" (first published in The Washington Post)
 "The View from the Cheap Seats" (first published in The Guardian)
 "Once Upon a Time" (first published in The Guardian)
 "Introduction to Hothouse" (first published in Hothouse)
 "Entitlement Issues" (first published at Neil Gaiman's Blog))
 "Freedom of Icky Speech" (first published at Neil Gaiman's blog))
 "Harvey Awards Speech 2004" (first published at Neil Gaiman's blog))
 "Nebula Award Speech 2005" (first published at Neil Gaiman's blog))
 "Conjunctions" (first published in Mythic Delirium #20)

References

Fantasy short story collections
2011 short story collections
Short story collections by Neil Gaiman